Lucy Oliver (née van Dalen; born 18 November 1988 in Wanganui) is a New Zealand middle-distance runner, who competed at the 2012 Summer Olympics, in the Women's 1500 metres. Along with her twin sister Holly, Lucy attended Stony Brook University in New York until 2012, earning an undergraduate degree in sociology followed by a Master of Arts in Liberal Studies (MA/LS). She was chosen an NCAA All-American for outdoor track (2010, 2011 and 2012), indoor track (2011 and 2012) and cross-country (2011).  She competed in the 3000 m at the 2014 World Indoor Championships.  At the 2014 Commonwealth Games, she competed in the 1500 m and the 5000 m.

At the 2016 Olympics, she competed in the 5000 m.

Personal bests
Outdoor

Indoor

Achievements

References

External links
 
 

1988 births
Living people
New Zealand female middle-distance runners
Olympic athletes of New Zealand
Athletes (track and field) at the 2012 Summer Olympics
Athletes (track and field) at the 2014 Commonwealth Games
Sportspeople from Whanganui
Stony Brook University alumni
Athletes (track and field) at the 2016 Summer Olympics
New Zealand twins
New Zealand female cross country runners
Commonwealth Games competitors for New Zealand